Juan Carlos Echeverry may refer to:

 Juan Carlos Echeverry (singer), Colombian operatic tenor
 Juan Carlos Echeverry (politician) (born 1962), Colombian economist and current president of Ecopetrol